Lévis is a city in eastern Quebec, Canada, located on the south shore of the St. Lawrence River, opposite Quebec City. A ferry links Old Quebec with Old Lévis, and two bridges, the Quebec and the Pierre-Laporte, connect western Lévis with Quebec City.

The population in July 2017 was 144,147. Its current incarnation was founded on January 1, 2002, as the result of a merger among ten cities, including the older city of Lévis founded in 1861.

Lévis is also the name of a territory equivalent to a regional county municipality (TE) and census division (CD) of Quebec, coextensive with the city of Lévis. Its geographical code is 25 as a census division, and 251 as an RCM-equivalent territory.

History
First Nations and prehistoric indigenous peoples settled in this area for thousands of years due to its ideal location at the confluence of the Chaudière and the St. Lawrence rivers. Many archeological sites reveal evidence of human occupation dating to 10,000 years ago. Some historians theorize that Pointe-Lévy could have been one of the main centres of Native American population development in what became the province of Québec.

In 1636, approximately 28 years after the French founded Quebec City, the seignory of Lauzon was founded on the eastern part of this territory. In the following years, other seignories were founded near the St. Lawrence River. Pointe-Lévy was primarily developed as an agricultural domain, in which several land-owners ("Seigneurs") controlled their part of land in a medieval feudal system.

The land of the Lauzon seignory remained unoccupied until 1647, when Guillaume Couture became the first French settler installed by Quebec City. Couture was serving as the first Administrator, Chief Magistrate, Captain of the Militia, and member of the Sovereign Council; he was widely considered a hero among colonists in New France. Couture, however, was not the first 'Seigneur' of the Lauzon Seignory, as the land had been previously owned by Jean de Lauson (French Governor between 1651 and 1657).

During the Seven Years' War, in the summer of 1759, British General James Wolfe established a camp in the territory of Pointe-Lévy and laid siege to Quebec City. The siege succeeded. After being under bombardment for three months and fighting the English in the battle on the Plains of Abraham in front of the walls, Quebec fell to the British. During this time, Pointe-Lévy served as the main encampment of the British army in the Quebec area. The constant cannon firing between Quebec City and Pointe-Lévy discouraged both French and British ships from advancing further up the St. Lawrence, and reinforcements and supplies did not reach other major cities such as Montréal.

In 1763, after the English took over French territory east of the Mississippi River in North America, a jury convicted Marie-Josephte Corriveau, "la Corriveau", of murdering her husband with a pitch-fork and she was condemned to death. She was hanged in Quebec City, and the British displayed her body in a cage for several weeks in Saint-Joseph-de-la-Pointe-Lévy (old part of the former City of Lauzon). This was the first time they had used this practice in North America; it was reserved for persons found guilty of particularly heinous crimes. This punishment had been practised in England since the Middle Ages.

From 1854, the railroad was constructed to Pointe-Lévy; it became a major transportation centre for commerce and immigration. As it was located on the south shore of the St. Lawrence River, Pointe-Levy could be connected by rail to Ontario and the Maritime Provinces, as well as to Maine and all the United States.

Between 1865 and 1872, the British constructed three forts in order to protect the City of Quebec and its surroundings, from the threat of an American invasion in the aftermath of its civil war. The British had maintained relations with the Confederacy during the war and at times helped its ships evade the Union blockade, so feared retaliation. Those garrisons never had to serve their intended purpose. One of them, Fort-Chambly, still stands to this day and is open to the public.

The City of Lévis, named after the successor to Montcalm, the Chevalier de Levis, was developed beginning in 1861. Its founder was Monsignor Joseph-David Déziel (1806–1882). As more settlements developed, there were changes among the municipalities in the territory of present-day Lévis; many were merged between 1861 and 2002, reflecting changes in governance. The Village of Pointe-Levy (or Saint-Joseph-de-la-Pointe-Lévy) was renamed as the Village of Lauzon in 1867 and incorporated as the City of Lauzon in 1910.

In the late 19th and beginning of the 20th century, Alphonse Desjardins pioneered the credit union movement, establishing the first caisse populaire in Lévis. He began developing what later became the Desjardins Group by travelling throughout Quebec and helping people in other cities start their own credit unions.

Legacy
On June 28, 1985 Canada Post issued "Fort No.1, Point Levis, Que.", one of 20 stamps in the "Forts Across Canada Series" (1983 and 1985). The stamps are perforated  x 13 mm and were printed by Ashton-Potter Limited, based on the designs by Rolf P. Harder.

Geography

Lévis covers an area of : 10% urban, 48% farmlands, 36% forests and 6% wetlands. In addition to the Saint Lawrence River, the Etchemin and Chaudière rivers also run through the city before ending their journey into the Saint Lawrence. The Chaudière River also boasts a waterfall with a suspended bridge, which can be accessed from Autoroute 73.

Lévis County existed until January 1982 when it was divided into Desjardins Regional County Municipality and Les Chutes-de-la-Chaudière Regional County Municipality.

On January 1, 2002, ten cities were merged by the Quebec provincial government to form the new city of Lévis. Previously, the former cities of Lauzon and Saint-David-de-l'Auberivière had been merged to Lévis in 1989. The regional county municipalities of which these cities were a part ceased to exist.

Boroughs
The new city was divided into three arrondissements or boroughs. Desjardins, Les Chutes-de-la-Chaudière-Ouest and Les Chutes-de-la-Chaudière-Est, which correspond to most of the territory of the former RCMs (however, Saint-Henri and Saint-Lambert-de-Lauzon remained independent and did not amalgamate into Lévis).

The ten former municipalities are today districts (secteurs) within the city; each of the three boroughs is composed of either three or four districts.

Former municipalities (10) 
Lévis (pre-2002 borders of the city)
Charny
Pintendre
Sainte-Hélène-de-Breakeyville
Saint-Étienne-de-Lauzon
Saint-Jean-Chrysostome
Saint-Joseph-de-la-Pointe-de-Lévy
Saint-Nicolas
Saint-Romuald
Saint-Rédempteur

The pre-2002 Lévis had already merged with Lauzon and Saint-David-de-l'Auberivière in 1989.

Demographics 

Ethnicity 
The city is one of the most homogeneous in Canada: around 95% of the population is of European ancestry.

Note: Totals greater than 100% due to multiple origin responses.

Language 
Over 97% of residents speak French as their mother tongue.

Economy

Although a relatively small city, Lévis is not a typical suburb. The presence of several large employers has allowed many citizens to both live and work in Lévis. It is home to Valero's Jean-Gaulin refinery, one of the largest in eastern Canada, Frito-Lay and Davie Shipbuilding are located in the borough of Lauzon (former city). The Desjardins Group, as well as its subsidiary Desjardins Financial Security, are headquartered in the city. The founder, Alphonse Desjardins, lived in Lévis and, with his wife, Dorimène Roy Desjardins, ran the first Caisse Populaire (similar to a credit union) from their home. The city is also a major agricultural business research and development centre. More high technology companies, such as Creaform (3D), have been established in Lévis.

Lévis is home to the enclosed regional shopping mall Les Galeries Chagnon which has 106 stores.

Many small business and entertainment developed in the city during the last decade and finalized the transformation from a Quebec City suburb into a small city.

Education
Commission scolaire des Navigateurs operates Francophone public schools.

There are many schools of different levels, including the Cégep de Lévis-Lauzon and a UQAR campus (Université du Québec à Rimouski).

Notable people

 Alphonse Desjardins – co-operator, founder of the Desjardins Group
 Jean Carignan – fiddler
 Céline Bonnier – actress
 Ariane Moffatt – singer
 Pierre-Luc Létourneau-Leblond – hockey player for the New Jersey Devils
 Kalyna Roberge – speed skater
 Charles Hamelin – short-track speed skater
 Claude Auger – 34th Canadian Surgeon General
 Louise Carrier – Artist

See also
 Levis De-Icer
 List of regional county municipalities and equivalent territories in Quebec
 Municipal reorganization in Quebec

Notes

References

External links
  Ville de Lévis

 
Cities and towns in Quebec
Territories equivalent to a regional county municipality
Quebec populated places on the Saint Lawrence River
1861 establishments in Canada